Anton the Last is a 1939 comedy film directed by E. W. Emo and starring Elfriede Datzig, Hans Moser, and O. W. Fischer. The film was made by Wien-Film, a Vienna-based company set up after Austria had been incorporated into Greater Germany following the 1938 Anschluss.

Cast

References

Bibliography

External links 
 

1939 films
Austrian comedy films
Films of Nazi Germany
German comedy films
1939 comedy films
Films directed by E. W. Emo
Films set in Vienna
Bavaria Film films
German black-and-white films
1930s German-language films
Austrian black-and-white films
1930s German films